The Christmas Burglars is a 1908 American silent short drama film directed by D. W. Griffith.

Cast
 Florence Lawrence as Mrs. Martin
 Adele DeGarde as Margie, Mrs. Martin's Daughter
 Charles Inslee as Mike McLaren
 John R. Cumpson
 Gladys Egan
 George Gebhardt as One of Mike's Assistants
 Arthur V. Johnson as One of Mike's Assistants
 Marion Leonard as Customer
 Jeanie MacPherson as Customer
 Tom Moore as Customer
 Mack Sennett as One of Mike's Assistants
 Harry Solter as One of Mike's Assistants
 Charles West

See also
 List of Christmas films

References

External links
 

1908 films
1900s Christmas drama films
1908 short films
American silent short films
American black-and-white films
American Christmas drama films
Films directed by D. W. Griffith
1900s American films
Silent American drama films